Sir James William Howie FRCP, FRCPGlas, FRCPE, FRCPath (31 December 1907 – 17 March 1995) was a Scottish bacteriologist, Director of the Public Health Laboratory Service, 1963–1973.

In November 1966, he was installed as the President of the College of Pathologists.

References 

 "HOWIE, Sir James (William)", Who Was Who, A & C Black, 1920–2008; online edn, Oxford University Press, Dec 2007, accessed 22 Feb 2012
 

1907 births
1995 deaths
Fellows of the Royal College of Physicians
Fellows of the Royal College of Physicians and Surgeons of Glasgow
Fellows of the Royal College of Physicians of Edinburgh
Fellows of the Royal College of Pathologists
Knights Bachelor
Scottish bacteriologists
20th-century surgeons